Mytilene International Airport "Odysseas Elytis"  is the international airport of Mytilene, the capital of the Greek island Lesbos.

History
The airport began to operate in 1948 however it was 1980 before the first charter flight landed.

In December 2015, the privatisation of Mytilene International Airport and 13 other regional airports of Greece was finalised with the signing of the agreement between the Fraport AG/Copelouzos Group joint venture and the state privatisation fund. "We signed the deal today," the head of Greece's privatisation agency HRADF, Stergios Pitsiorlas, told Reuters. According to the agreement, the joint venture will operate the 14 airports (including Mytilene International Airport) for 40 years as of 11 April 2017.

Facilities
The airport has one small terminal that services both International and Domestic flights. The airport is 8 kilometres from Mytilene. It was established in 1948 with an unpaved runway of 1200 meters long and 30 meters wide. Over the years the runway was paved and in 2000 the latest runway extension to 2400 meters was made. The airport has a duty-free shop, café-bar and two car rental agencies.

On the northern side of the south apron Mytilene Airclub is located.

Fraport Greece's investment plan

On 22 March 2017, Fraport Greece presented its master plan for the 14 regional airports including the International Airport of Mytilene.

Immediate actions that will be implemented at the airports as soon as Fraport Greece takes over operations before the launch of the summer season include:

 General clean-up
 Improving lighting, marking of airside areas
 Upgrading sanitary facilities
 Enhancing services and offering a new free Internet connection (WiFi)
 Implementing works to improve fire safety in all the areas of the airports

The following summarizes the enhancement changes that will be started in October 2017 and will be implemented for Mytilene International Airport under Fraport Greece's investment plan until 2021:

 New terminal
 New fire station
 New waste water treatment plant
 New airport apron area
 185 percent increase in the total size of the airport at 7,185 m2
 29 percent increase in the number of check-in counters (from 7 to 9)

Airlines and destinations
The following airlines operate regular scheduled and charter flights at Mytilene Airport:

Traffic figures

The data are from the official website of the airport:

Traffic statistics by country (2022)

See also
Transport in Greece

References

External links

Airports in Greece
Buildings and structures in Mytilene